Paula Cannon is a British geneticist and virologist, Distinguished Professor of Molecular Microbiology & Immunology at the University of Southern California. She is a specialist in gene therapy, hematopoietic stem cells, and human immunodeficiency virus (HIV) with particular interest in gene editing and humanized mice.

Personal life and education
She received her PhD from the University of Liverpool, and   postdoctoral training   at both Oxford and Harvard

Academic career
Cannon's   recent work  is aimed at disrupting the CCR  viral co-receptor, CCR5, using zinc finger nucleases(ZFNs). She also studies SARS-CoV-2 and highly pathogenic hemorrhagic fever viruses, including Ebola and Lassa fever viruses.

Selected publications
Her most cited peer-reviewed publications are:
Soneoka Y, Cannon PM, Ramsdale EE, Griffiths JC, Romano G, Kingsman SM, Kingsman AJ. A transient three-plasmid expression system for the production of high titer retroviral vectors. Nucleic Acids research. 1995 Feb 25;23(4):628-33.  open access Cited 932 times, according to Google Scholar,
Holt N, Wang J, Kim K, Friedman G, Wang X, Taupin V, Crooks GM, Kohn DB, Gregory PD, Holmes MC, Cannon PM. Human hematopoietic stem/progenitor cells modified by zinc-finger nucleases targeted to CCR5 control HIV-1 in vivo. Nature Biotechnology. 2010 Aug;28(8):839-47. Cited 762 times, according to Google Scholar 
Deeks SG, Lewin SR, Ross AL, Ananworanich J, Benkirane M, Cannon P, Chomont N, Douek D, Lifson JD, Lo YR, Kuritzkes D. International AIDS Society global scientific strategy: towards an HIV cure 2016. Nature Medicine. 2016 Aug;22(8):839-50.  Cited 375 times, according to Google Scholar 
Gardner MR, Kattenhorn LM, Kondur HR, Von Schaewen M, Dorfman T, Chiang JJ, Haworth KG, Decker JM, Alpert MD, Bailey CC, Neale ES. AAV-expressed eCD4-Ig provides durable protection from multiple SHIV challenges. Nature. 2015 Mar;519(7541):87-91.  Cited 275 times, according to Google Scholar 
Wang J, Exline CM, DeClercq JJ, Llewellyn GN, Hayward SB, Li PW, Shivak DA, Surosky RT, Gregory PD, Holmes MC, Cannon PM. Homology-driven genome editing in hematopoietic stem and progenitor cells using ZFN mRNA and AAV6 donors. Nature biotechnology. 2015 Dec;33(12):1256-63. Cited 242  times, according to Google Scholar

References

External links

Living people
Year of birth missing (living people)
Place of birth missing (living people)
University of Southern California faculty
21st-century American biologists
British geneticists
British virologists
Alumni of the University of Liverpool
British women geneticists
Women virologists